Doro Pesch is a German heavy metal singer that started her career in native Düsseldorf in the early 80s with the underground bands Snakebite and Beast. In 1982, she joined the German heavy metal band Warlock, which got its first contract with the Belgian independent label Mausoleum Records to record the album Burning the Witches. The new band quickly entered the circuit of the most sought-after support bands in the European boiling panorama of metal live shows of the 80s, receiving enthusiastic reviews and gaining a solid fan base. Warlock soon stepped up to main attraction on European tours and their albums, issued under the Vertigo label, sold well in Germany and caught the attention of US promoters, who organized a tour in the United States. Their fourth album Triumph and Agony was produced in the US and entered the Billboard 200 chart, thanks also to the videos of the songs "All We Are" and "Für Immer" on rotation on MTV. By 1988, all German members of the band, except Doro, were replaced by American musicians and Warlock ceased to exist, because of legal problems about the rights on the name and logo.

Doro started her solo recording career with the album Force Majeure, fulfilling her contract with the Vertigo label until 1995 with other four studio albums. Because of the lack of charting success, her second Gene Simmons-produced, eponymous album in 1990 was the last one issued in the USA until Calling the Wild, ten years later. However, Doro's albums always charted in Germany and other European countries, with very good sales of singles in recent years both in Germany and in Spain. The 2004 album Classic Diamonds was a collaboration with the Classic Night Orchestra, which reworked some of her earlier songs with symphonic and acoustic arrangements. Doro is now a very respected veteran singer in the heavy metal world and she often features in duets with other singers and bands.

The compilation Rare Diamonds of 1991 has songs from both Warlock albums and Doro's first albums and is listed twice.

Snakebite demo
 Jolly Joker (1983)

Beast demo
 Paradies (1983)

Warlock albums

Studio albums

Compilation albums

Extended plays
 Fight for Rock (1986)

Singles

Demos
 1983 demo (1983)
 Mausoleum Demo (1983)

Bootlegs
 Metalbound (1985, LP, live recording with the first line-up, from 14 September 1985)
 More Doro Power (1986, LP, live recording with the second line-up, from 11 December 1985)
 Ready for Promotion (1986, LP, live recording with the second line-up, from 16 August 1986)
 The Last Witch (1987, LP, live recording with the first line-up)
 True as Steel + Triumph and Agony (2001, CD, Russian release, double album)
 Music Box (2003, CD, Top Rec., Russian release, compilation)

Tribute album
 Tribute to Steel (2008)

Video albums
 Metal Racer (1985)
 The Videos (listed as Doro & Warlock, 1989)
 Rare Diamonds (1991)
 Doro Pesch and Warlock: Live (2001)

Music videos

Doro albums

Studio albums

Live albums

Compilation albums

Extended plays

Singles

Other appearances

Video albums

Music videos

Duets

 21 April 1997: Die Krupps feat. Doro Pesch - "Taste of Taboo" (on Paradise Now)
 1 September 2000: Doro Pesch feat. Lemmy - "Love Me Forever",  "Alone Again" on Calling the Wild
 22 October 2000: Motörhead feat. Doro Pesch - "Born to Raise Hell" (on Live at Brixton Academy - live)
 December 2000: Dio feat. Doro Pesch - "Man on the Silver Mountain", "Long Live Rock'n'Roll" (live)
 May 2001: Mägo de Oz feat. Doro Pesch - "Man on the Silver Mountain" (Rainbow cover)
 3 August 2001: Holy Moses feat. Doro Pesch - "Too Drunk to Fuck" (Dead Kennedys cover - live)
 21 October 2001: Powergod feat. Doro Pesch - "Burning the Witches" (on Bleed for the Gods: That's Metal - Lesson I)
 25 March 2002: Udo Dirkschneider feat. Doro Pesch - "Dancing with an Angel" (on Man and Machine)
 10 May 2002: Killer feat. Doro Pesch - "All We Are", "Burning the Witches" (on Mausoleum - The Official 20th Anniversary Concert Album - live)
 5 August 2002: Crown of Thorns feat. Doro Pesch - "Shed No Tears" (on Karma)
 24 September 2002: Doro Pesch feat. Peter Steele - "Descent" on Fight
 13 December 2003: Doro Pesch feat. Udo Dirkschneider - "East Meets West" on 20 Years – A Warrior Soul (live)
 13 December 2003: Doro Pesch feat. Jean Beauvoir - "White Wedding" on 20 Years - A Warrior Soul (live)
 13 December 2003: Doro Pesch feat. Blaze Bailey - "Bad Blood" on 20 Years - A Warrior Soul (live)
 13 December 2003: Doro Pesch feat. Lemmy and Mikkey Dee - "Love Me Forever" on 20 Years - A Warrior Soul (live)
 13 December 2003: Doro Pesch feat. Saxon - "You've Got Another Thing Comin'" (Judas Priest cover - live) on 20 Years - A Warrior Soul
 13 December 2003: Doro Pesch feat. Claus Lessmann - "Born to Be Wild" on 20 Years - A Warrior Soul (live)
 6 August 2004: Doro Pesch feat. Blaze Bayley - "Fear of the Dark" (Iron Maiden cover - live) on Classic Diamonds – The DVD
 20 September 2004: Doro Pesch feat. Udo Dirkschneider - "Breaking the Law" (Judas Priest cover) on Classic Diamonds
 22 August 2005: Destruction feat. Doro Pesch - "The Alliance of Hellhoundz" (on Inventor of Evil)
 12 September 2005: Doro Pesch feat. Regina Halmich - "We're Like Thunder"
 25 November 2005: Dirk Bach feat. Doro Pesch - "Gimme Gimme Gimme" (ABBA cover)
 17 October 2006: Twisted Sister feat. Doro Pesch - "White Christmas" (on A Twisted Christmas)
 2006: Doro Pesch feat. Marc Storace & Luke Gasser - "On My Own" on Anuk - Der Weg Des Kriegers soundtrack
 25 March 2006: Ministry feat. Jørn Lande vs. Doro Pesch - "All We Are" (live)
 21 April 2006: Dezperadoz feat. Doro Pesch - "Earp's Vendetta" (on The Legend and the Truth)
 23 April 2007: After Forever feat. Doro Pesch - "Who I Am" (on After Forever)
 October 2007: Kreyson feat. Doro Pesch - "Deep in the Night"
 19 October 2007: Doro Pesch feat. Sabina Classen - "All We Are" (live)
23 June 2008 - Judas Priest feat. Doro Pesch - "Breaking the Law" (live)
 31 October 2008: Kissin' Time feat. Doro Pesch - "All We Are" (live)
 31 October 2008: Doro Pesch feat. Biff Byford - "Celebrate"
 31 October 2008: Doro Pesch feat. Sabina Classen, Floor Jansen, Angela Gossow, Veronica Freeman, Liv Kristine, Ji-In Cho, Liv Jagrell, Girlschool - "Celebrate"
 1 December 2008: Tarja Turunen feat. Doro Pesch - "The Seer"
 13 December 2008: Doro Pesch feat. Bobby Ellsworth - "Always Live to Win" on 25 Years in Rock... and Still Going Strong (live)
 13 December 2008: Doro Pesch feat. Jean Beauvoir - "Burn It Up" on 25 Years in Rock... and Still Going Strong (live)
 13 December 2008: Doro Pesch feat. Sabina Classen, Floor Jansen, Liv Kristine, Ji-In Cho, Liv Jagrell, Girlschool on 25 Years in Rock... and Still Going Strong (live)
 13 December 2008: Doro Pesch feat. Tarja Turunen - "Walking with the Angels" on 25 Years in Rock... and Still Going Strong (live)
 13 December 2008: Doro Pesch feat. Chris Boltendahl & Axel Rudi Pell - "East Meets West" on 25 Years in Rock... and Still Going Strong (live)
 13 December 2008: Doro Pesch feat. Klaus Meine & Rudolph Schenker - "Big City Nights", "Rock You Like a Hurricane" on 25 Years in Rock... and Still Going Strong (live)
 13 December 2008: Doro Pesch feat. Warrel Dane - "True as Steel" on 25 Years in Rock... and Still Going Strong (live)
 13 December 2008: Doro Pesch feat. Honza K.B. Hunek - "Unholy Love" on 25 Years in Rock... and Still Going Strong (live)
 23 January 2009: Doro Pesch feat. Tarja Turunen - "Walking with the Angels" on Fear No Evil
 2009: Saxon feat. Doro Pesch - "747 (Strangers in the Night)" (live)
 29 July 2009: Skyline feat. Doro Pesch - "We Are the Metalheads - Wacken Anthem"
 28 August 2009: Saltatio Mortis feat. Doro Pesch - "Salomé" (on Wer Wind Sät)
 2010: Motörhead feat. Doro Pesch - "Killed by Death", "Born to Raise Hell" (live)
 3 August 2010: Grave Digger feat. Doro Pesch - "The Ballad of Mary (Queen of Scots)" (on The Clans Are Still Marching - live)
 2011: Saxon feat. Doro Pesch - "Denim and Leather" (live)
 22 April 2011: Krypteria feat. Doro Pesch - "Victoria" (on All Beauty Must Die)
 9 September 2011: Doro Pesch feat. Mark Tornillo - "East Meets West" (live)
 26 September 2011: Girlschool feat. Doro Pesch - "Hit and Run" (on Hit and Run – Revisited)
 30 September 2011: Sister Sin feat. Doro Pesch - "Rock 'n' Roll" (Motörhead cover)
 9 December 2011: Doro Pesch feat. Tom Angelripper - "Merry Metal X-Mas"
 19 October 2012: Doro Pesch feat. Lemmy - "It Still Hurts" on Raise Your Fist
 23 November 2012: Die Happy feat. Doro Pesch - "Good Things" (1000th Show Live)
 8 August 2013: Doro Pesch feat. Chris Boltendahl - "East Meets West" (live)
 8 August 2013: Doro Pesch feat. Biff Byford - "Denim and Leather" (live)
 8 August 2013: Doro Pesch feat. Uli Jon Roth - "Für immer" (live)
 8 August 2013: Doro Pesch feat. Subway to Sally - "Metal Tango" (live)
 8 August 2013: Doro Pesch feat. Phil Campbell - "Breaking the Law" (live)
 24 October 2014: Liv Kristine feat. Doro Pesch - "Stronghold of Angels" (on Vervain)
 17 December 2014: Angra feat. Doro Pesch - "Crushing Room" (on Secret Garden)
 25 March 2016: Amon Amarth feat. Doro Pesch - "A Dream That Cannot Be" (on Jomsviking)
 30 August 2021: Show-Ya feat. Dorothee Pesch - "Heavy Metal Feminity" (on Showdown)

References

External links
 Doro Pesch - Official Doro Website

Discography
Heavy metal group discographies
Discographies of German artists